Lamspringe is a former Samtgemeinde ("collective municipality") in the district of Hildesheim, in Lower Saxony, Germany. Its seat was in the village Lamspringe. On 1 November 2016 it was dissolved.

The Samtgemeinde Lamspringe consisted of the following municipalities:

 Harbarnsen 
 Lamspringe
 Neuhof 
 Sehlem 
 Woltershausen

Former Samtgemeinden in Lower Saxony